Bazooka Girl (real name: Cristiana Cucchi) is a Eurobeat vocalist and one of the most well-known names on "HI-NRG Attack", an Italian record label. 

Cristiana has worked under many different aliases, and before joining HI-NRG Attack, she worked under the name, "Chris", an alias that she still apparently uses at the HI-NRG Attack record company.

Songs
 Bazooka Girl - Bazooka Girl 
 Bazooka Girl - Campus Summit 
 Bazooka Girl - Cantare Ballare (Happy Eurobeat) 
 Bazooka Girl - Flying Around The World
 Bazooka Girl - Mister Robinson 
 Bazooka Girl - Velfarre 2000 
 Franz "V.I.P." Tornado & Bazooka "T.C.V." Girl - Super Euro Flash 
 Franz Tornado & Bazooka Girl - Caballero With Sombrero
 Bazooka Girl - Nel Blu Dipinto Di Blu 
 Bazooka Girl - Hey Hey Velfarre (unreleased) 
 Bazooka Girl - The Class Of Velfarre
 Bazooka Girl - Everybody Velfarre
 Bazooka Girl - Money Funny Dollars 
 Franz Tornado & Bazooka Girl - Motto-Motto Inamoto 
 Chris - First Time (12 remix) 
 Chris - First Time (last version) 
 Chris - Hey Dee Jay (Dee Jay Pazzo Mix) 
 ) 
 Chris - Not For Money 
 Chris - Power Of My Love 
 Chris - Take Me To The Top (ultimate mix) 
 Chris - Viva L'Amour
 Chris - Two by Two
 Chriss- With A Boy Like You
 Chriss - Sweets For My Sweet
 Chriss - Lucky Boy
 Princess F. - Infidelity
 Princess F. - Technotronic Flight
 Princess F. - Shadows in the Night
 Leslie Hammond - Friends in the Name of Love
 Leslie Hammond - Feel My Body and Soul
 HRG Unlimited - Come On in Tokyo
 HRG Unlimited - The Story of Max and Kaori
 HRG Unlimited - Greatest Lover
 Betty Blue - We Can Make it Stronger
 Betty Blue - Go Go Baby
 Betty Blue - Good Time
 Betty Blue - Changes
 Valery Scott - No More Tears
 Live Music Gang - This is Para Para
 Cindy - Gucci Girl
 Cindy - Jammin' Spanish Men
 Lou Lou Marina - Latin Lover

External links
Bazooka Girl's artist page on Eurobeat Prime
Image of Chris on 'Two by Two' 12" single

Italian women singers
Italian dance musicians
Eurobeat musicians
Living people
Place of birth missing (living people)
Year of birth missing (living people)